Kaatedocus is a genus of diplodocine flagellicaudatan sauropod known from the middle Late Jurassic (Kimmeridgian stage) of northern Wyoming, United States. It is known from well-preserved skull and cervical vertebrae which were collected in the lower part of the Morrison Formation. The type and only species is Kaatedocus siberi, described in 2012 by Emanuel Tschopp and Octávio Mateus.

History

In 1934, a team of the American Museum of Natural History (AMNH) headed by Barnum Brown, financed by the Sinclair Oil Corporation, uncovered about three thousand sauropod bones on the land of rancher Barker Howe near Shell, in Big Horn County. Plans for further excavations in 1935 had to be cancelled after Howe, convinced by the large publicity surrounding the find that the remains were very valuable, demanded higher payment. The bones would not be described and most of them were lost in a fire at the AMNH during the 1940s; other were thrown away in the 1960s after having rotted because of being stowed in a chicken run at Shell. Only about 10% of the fossils survived, among them a skull. They were generally interpreted as belonging to Barosaurus. In 1989 the site was reopened by Hans-Jakob Siber, the founder of the Swiss Aathal Dinosaur Museum. His team immediately adjacent to the old How Quarry discovered another 450 bones that became part of the collection of the Swiss museum.

The finds included an exceptionally complete neck. In Switzerland, this became the subject of several lines of scientific investigation. In 2005 Daniela Schwarz studied the pneumatisation of the vertebrae by tomography scanning them with neutrons and X-rays. In 2010 Andreas Christian used the well-preserved vertebrae to support his hypothesis that sauropod necks were held in a rather upright position, which was confirmed by Armin Schmitt studying the vestibular system of Kaatedocus. In 2012 Tschopp used a scan to create a replica of the neck by means of a 3D-printer.

During the intense study of the fossils it became clear that they did not represent Barosaurus but a species new to science. In 2012 this was named Kaatedocus siberi, by the Swiss palaeontologist Emanuel Tschopp, who as a boy had visited the excavations, and his Portuguese colleague Octávio Mateus. The generic name, which means "small beam", combines a reference to the related form Diplodocus with a Crow Indian diminutive suffix ~kaate. The specific name honours Siber.

Classification
 
 
Tschopp, Mateus, and Benson (2015) found Kaatedocus to an advanced member of the Diplodocinae, closely related to Barosaurus, as shown below.

On the other hand, Whitlock and Wilson (2020) find Kaatedocus to be the most basal dicraeosaurid, finding such a position more likely than being a diplodocid.

References

Late Jurassic dinosaurs of North America
Dinosaurs of the Morrison Formation
Fossil taxa described in 2012
Diplodocids
Taxa named by Octávio Mateus
Paleontology in Wyoming